Diopsina is a genus of stalk-eyed flies in the family Diopsidae.

Species
D. draconigena Feijen, 1981
D. ferruginea Curran, 1928
D. fluegeli Feijen, 2013
D. intermedia Feijen, 1984
D. kwaipai Feijen, 1981
D. nitida (Adams, 1903)
D. schulteni Feijen, 1978

References

Diopsidae
Diptera of Africa
Taxa named by Charles Howard Curran
Diopsoidea genera